Mount Challenger is a mountain on East Falkland, Falkland Islands. It is south of Mount Kent. The area saw some action during the Falklands War, and some of it is still mined. The Murrell River rises on Mount Challenger.

References

Challenger